Tripudia grapholithoides is a species of moth in the family Noctuidae (the owlet moths). It is found in the Caribbean Sea, North America, and South America.

The MONA or Hodges number for Tripudia grapholithoides is 9004.

References

Further reading

 
 
 

Eustrotiinae
Articles created by Qbugbot
Moths described in 1890